Barbara Ann Scott  (May 9, 1928 – September 30, 2012) was a Canadian figure skater. She was the 1948 Olympic champion, a two-time World champion (1947–1948), and a four-time Canadian national champion (1944–46, 48) in ladies' singles. Known as "Canada's Sweetheart,” she is the only Canadian to have won the Olympic ladies' singles gold medal, the first North American to have won three major titles in one year and the only Canadian to have won the European Championship (1947–48). During her forties she was rated among the top equestrians in North America. She received many honours and accolades, including being made an Officer of the Order of Canada in 1991 and a member of the Order of Ontario in 2008.

Life and career
Scott was born on May 9, 1928, the youngest of three children born to Canadian Army Colonel Clyde Rutherford Scott and Mary (née Purves) of Sandy Hill, Ottawa. She began skating at the age of seven with the Minto Skating Club, coached by Otto Gold and Sheldon Galbraith. At age nine, Scott switched from regular schooling to tutoring two-and-a-half hours a day in order to accommodate her seven hours of daily ice training. At the age of ten she became the youngest skater ever to pass the "gold figures test" and at eleven years won her first national junior title. By the age of fifteen, Scott became Canada's senior national champion, she held the Canadian Figure Skating championship title from 1944-46.

In 1947, with funding raised by the community, Scott traveled overseas and became the first North American to win both the European and World Figure Skating championships, and remains the only Canadian to have won the European title. This led to her being voted Canadian Newsmaker of the Year in 1947. On her return to Ottawa during a parade she was  given a yellow Buick convertible (license plate: 47-U-1); however it had to be returned for her to retain amateur status, to be eligible for the 1948 Winter Olympics.

During the 1948 season, Scott was able to defend both the World Figure Skating and the European Skating Championships, and reacquired the Canadian Figure Skating Championship, becoming the first North American to win all three in the same year and the first to hold consecutive world titles. She was featured on the cover of Time magazine on February 2, 1948, one week before her Olympic debut in St. Moritz, Switzerland.

At the 1948 Winter Olympics, Scott became the first and only Canadian in history to win the ladies' singles figure skating gold medal. After the Olympic win she received a telegram from Prime Minister Mackenzie King, stating that she gave "Canadians courage to get through the darkness of the post-war gloom.” When Scott returned to Ottawa on March 9, 1948, the car that she originally relinquished in 1947 was given back (license plate now: 48-U-1), and she also received the "Key" to the city. She was commonly referred to as "Canada's Sweetheart" in the press at this time, so much so that a collectible doll (accompanied by a letter from her) was issued in her honour in 1948.

Scott officially relinquished her amateur status in the summer of 1948 and began touring North America and Europe, headlining in a variety of shows over the next five years. Among her early successes was Tom Arnold's Rose Marie on Ice at the Harringay Arena in London, UK. She went on to replace her childhood idol Sonja Henie in the starring role with the "Hollywood Ice Revue" in Chicago, which became the subject of a Life cover story on February 4, 1952. The grueling schedule of a professional skater took its toll, and at the age of twenty-five she retired from professional skating. 

In 1955, aged 27, she married publicist and former professional basketball player Tom King at Rosedale Presbyterian Church in Toronto. The couple settled in Chicago, where she opened a beauty salon for a short time, then became a distinguished horse trainer and equestrian rider by her forties. During this time, Scott founded and became chancellor of the International Academy of Merchandising and Design in Toronto. In 1996, the couple retired  to Amelia Island, Florida. She remained an influential figure in skating throughout her life; she appeared in films and TV, published books, served as a skating judge, and was formally recognized for her educational and charitable causes including donating a percentage of her earnings to aid crippled children.

As a Canadian sports icon  and marking the fortieth anniversary of her Olympic win, she was asked to carry the Olympic torch in the lead-up to the 1988 Winter Olympic Games in Calgary. In December 2009, she again carried the Olympic torch, this time to Parliament Hill and into the House of Commons, in anticipation of the 2010 Winter Olympics. She subsequently was one of the Olympic flag bearers during the opening ceremonies in Vancouver on February 12, 2010. In 2012, the city of Ottawa announced the creation of the Barbara Ann Scott Gallery, which displays photographs, her championship awards, and the Olympic gold medal that Scott formally donated to the city in 2011.

Scott died on September 30, 2012, at her home in Fernandina Beach, Amelia Island, Florida at age 84. Her obituary listed her name as Barbara Ann Scott King. A local arena was named after her in Nepean, Ontario, as part of the Pinecrest Recreation Centre.

Orders, accolades and medals

Scott was made an Officer of the Order of Canada in 1991, and a member of the Order of Ontario in 2008 for her contributions to sports and charitable endeavours.

She was inducted into the Canadian Olympic Hall of Fame in 1948, Canada's Sports Hall of Fame in 1955, the Ottawa Sports Hall of Fame in 1966, the Skate Canada Hall of Fame in 1991, the International Women's Sports Hall of Fame in 1997, the Ontario Sports Hall of Fame in 1997, and in 1998 was named to Canada's Walk of Fame. The Barbara Ann Scott Ice Trail at Toronto's College Park is named after the skater.

Her first major honour came in the form of the Lou Marsh Trophy as Canada's Top Athlete of the Year in 1945, which she subsequently won in both 1947 and 1948.

Bibliography

Filmography

See also

Canada at the 1948 Winter Olympics
Petra Burka
Karen Magnussen
Elizabeth Manley
Kaetlyn Osmond
Joannie Rochette

References

External links

 Barbara Ann Scott - Library and Archives Canada (archived content)
 Canada's Sweetheart - CBC video archives (January 2, 1964 - 11:06 min)
 Interview with Barbara Ann Scott - Canada's History (February 24, 2010)
 Barbara Ann Scott Gallery - City of Ottawa
 
 
 
 

1928 births
2012 deaths
Canadian female single skaters
Figure skaters at the 1948 Winter Olympics
Lou Marsh Trophy winners
Olympic figure skaters of Canada
Officers of the Order of Canada
Sportspeople from Ottawa
Figure skaters from Chicago
Olympic gold medalists for Canada
Members of the Order of Ontario
Olympic medalists in figure skating
World Figure Skating Championships medalists
European Figure Skating Championships medalists
Medalists at the 1948 Winter Olympics
Skating people from Ontario
American sportswomen
21st-century American women